Naghdi is a  of the Islamic Republic of Iran Navy serving in the Southern Fleet. Launched in 1963 and commissioned into the fleet in 1964, Naghdi was transferred to Iran by the United States under the Mutual Assistance Program.

Service history 
Naghdi and her sister ship  arrived at The Ship Repair Facility in Guam on 10 April 1970 for an overhaul that took six months and costed Iran $1–1.5m. In the way home, the two made port calls to Subie Bay, Singapore, Colombo, Sri Lanka and Cochin, India. An alleged dump of 50,000 gallons of fuel in the sea by the ships prior to the repair stirred a local controversy. The two undergone another major repair in the same base in 1978.

During the  Iran–Iraq War (1980–1988), her home port was in Bushehr Naval Base along with her three sister ships.

Naghdi, her sister Bayandor and the amphibious ship  of the 50th naval group decked at Colombo, Sri Lanka and Mumbai, India during a multi-purpose anti-piracy, flag and training mission that started on 30 January 2018 and ended on 17 March 2018.

See also

 List of Imperial Iranian Navy vessels in 1979
 List of current ships of the Islamic Republic of Iran Navy

References

External links

Profile at Navsource Naval History 

1963 ships
Bayandor-class corvettes
Active corvettes of Iran
Ships built in Orange, Texas
Iran–Iraq War naval ships of Iran